The 2020 Acura Sports Car Challenge at Mid-Ohio was a sports car race sanctioned by the International Motor Sports Association (IMSA). The race was held at Mid-Ohio Sports Car Course in Lexington, Ohio on September 27th, 2020. This race was the sixth round of the 2020 WeatherTech SportsCar Championship, and the fifth round of the 2020 WeatherTech Sprint Cup.

Hélio Castroneves and Ricky Taylor claimed their third consecutive overall victory for Acura Team Penske, while Antonio García and Jordan Taylor were crowned victors in GTLM for the fourth time that season. In GTD, Jack Hawksworth and Aaron Telitz of AIM Vasser Sullivan similarly scored their third class victory of the season.

Background
The event was one of the first postponed by IMSA as a result of the emerging COVID-19 pandemic, with the organization citing CDC regulations on public gatherings as the official cause of postponement. A tentative reschedule for the weekend of September 27th followed shortly thereafter, which became the finalized date on which the race was held. As with most events on the 2020 calendar, the race was held with a limited number of spectators in accordance with Ohio Department of Health guidelines. A maximum of 6,000 spectators were permitted, facemasks were required, temperature checks were instituted, and paddock access was restricted. Acura Team Penske duo Dane Cameron and Juan Pablo Montoya entered the race as defending champions.

On September 11, 2020, IMSA released their latest technical bulletin outlining BoP for the race. The DPi class featured changes to fuel capacity, as the Cadillac and Mazda received three liter fuel capacity increases. No changes were made to GTLM competitors. In GTD, the Acura received a decreased fuel capacity of one liter, while the Porsche and Lexus received increases of one and two liters respectively. The Aston Martin also received a 30 kilogram weight decrease.

Entries

A total of 24 cars took part in the event, split across three classes. 8 were entered in DPi, 4 in GTLM, and 12 in GTD. JDC-Miller Motorsports' driver lineup once again shuffled, as Matheus Leist and Stephen Simpson were replaced by Tristan Vautier and Gabriel Aubry. Porsche's factory GTLM effort was sidelined at Mid-Ohio after positive COVID-19 tests within the team's 24 Hours of Le Mans camp, which had competed the previous weekend with much of their IMSA cohort in attendance. As a result, the already anemic GTLM class was further reduced to just four competitors. GTD featured a late withdrawal of the Scuderia Corsa Ferrari, as driver Cooper MacNeil was competing in both Ferrari Challenge and IMSA competition, and was leading the championship of the former. The Ferrari Challenge was racing at Laguna Seca, so MacNeil's IMSA entry was pulled from the Mid-Ohio race.

Qualifying
Dane Cameron took overall pole for the event. Jordan Taylor started first in GTLM, while Aaron Telitz was quickest in GTD.

Qualifying results

Results

References

External links

Acura Sports Car Challenge at Mid-Ohio
Acura Sports Car Challenge at Mid-Ohio
Acura Sports Car Challenge at Mid-Ohio